Pamvohaikos or Pamvochaikos (Greek: Παμβοχαϊκός) is a Greek volleyball club based in Vocha, Corinthia. It was founded in 1961. Since 2012, it plays in first division of Greek volleyleague (A1 Ethniki). Its home is at Vrahati, Corinthia and its colours are blue and yellow. The most successful accolade of Pamvohaikos was the second place of championship, in 2012–13 season.

Recent seasons
Pamvohaikos was promoted to A1 Ethniki in season 2010–11, for first time. At the first years in A1 Ethniki finished in the top places of the championship. In current season finished in 5th place.

Honours
Greek Volleyball Championship
Finalist (1): 2013

References

External links
Official site

Greek volleyball clubs